Frederick Herbert Morgan (29 October 1891 – 10 March 1966) was an Australian rules footballer who played with Richmond in the Victorian Football League (VFL).

Notes

External links 

1891 births
1966 deaths
Australian rules footballers from Victoria (Australia)
Richmond Football Club players